Joseph Brandreth M.D. (1746 – 10 April 1815) was an English physician. He was the physician to the Duke of Gloucester.

He was born in Ormskirk, Lancashire, in 1746. After graduating with an M.D. at Edinburgh in 1770, where his thesis, De Febribus intermittentibus, was published, he exercised his profession in his native town until about 1776, when he succeeded to the practice of Dr. Matthew Dobson, in Liverpool, on Dobson's retirement to Bath. He was appointed to the staff of the Infirmary in 1780, and was the first doctor in Liverpool to realise the value of applying cold water on fever. This remedy was described by Brandreth in a paper entitled On the Advantages arising from the Topical Application of Cold Water and Vinegar in Typhus and On the Use of Large Doses of Opium in certain cases. He remained in Liverpool for the remainder of his life, and became an eminently successful and popular practitioner. He was a man of wide and various reading, and possessed a most accurate and tenacious memory, which he attributed to his habit of depending on it without referring to notes. He established the Dispensary at Liverpool in 1778, and for thirty years gave great attention to the Infirmary. The Infirmary had 84 beds, and Joseph and other senior physicians and surgeons gave their services free of charge. The discovery of the utility of applying cold in fever is ascribed to him. This remedy he described in a paper On the Advantages arising from the Topical Application of Cold Water and Vinegar in Typhus, and on the Use of Large Doses of Opium in certain Cases. Joseph Brandreth lived in the heart of Liverpool during his practise for some time, in Church Street. He died in Liverpool, 10 April 1815.

The most famous physician in Liverpool at this time was James Currie, who also led a distinctive life devoted to the services of mankind. Alongside Currie, Brandreth was presented with the freedom of the borough in 1802. Brandreth is also considered one of the leading physicians of Liverpool during the end of the 18th century.

Early life and family  
Joseph Brandreth was born in the small market town of Ormskirk, a market town situated in south west Lancashire, England, in 1746. Ormskirk is situated on what was the ancient highway between Liverpool and Preston. He married Catherine Pilkington, born on 28 November 1751, the daughter of John Pilkington of Anderton and his wife Catherine Shaw. The marriage lasted 35 years, and produced 5 children. The family lived at 3 Paradise Street, as well as 44 School Lane in Liverpool.

Commemorations 
The Brandeth Club of Ormskirk was founded by the late Dr. Gerard Sanderson, Consultant Physician to the Ormskirk and District National Hospital, and named after Joseph Brandreth who had lived in Ormskirk and, in his day, achieved great distinction as a physician.

There is an impressive memorial to Joseph Brandreth in his hometown of Ormskirk, in the parish church, which has the following inscription:The Good Samaritan Memorial in Ormskirk Parish church to Dr. Joseph Brandreth
SACRED to the MEMORY of JOSEPH BRANDRETH MD

PHYSICIAN to HIS ROYAL HIGHNESS the DUKE OF GLOUCESTER

The Rt. HON EDWARD EARL & ELIZABETH COUNTESS of DERBY

He was many years first Physician to the LIVERPOOL INFIRMARY

And zealously exerted himself in establishing the DISPENSARY.

His Industry and Talents raised him to the head of his Profession

While the kindness of his heart rendered him universally beloved.

Born Oct 1745 - Died April 10th 1815

This memorial was erected by his Widow

CATHERINE BRANDRETH

Who died 22nd April 1827 aged 75.

References

19th-century English medical doctors
18th-century English medical doctors
People from Ormskirk
1746 births
1815 deaths